Angelin Preljocaj (born 19 January 1957) is a French dancer and choreographer of contemporary dance.

Early life
Angelin Preljocaj was born in 1957 in Sucy-en-Brie, France. He is of Albanian descent.

Career
His choreographic work is steeped in his writing of the history of classical ballet, but is resolutely contemporary. He joined the repertoire of the Ballet de l'Opéra national de Paris in the early 1990s. In 1995, he received the Prix Benois de la Danse as choreographer.

In December 1984 he founded the ballet company that in 1996 that was subsequently renamed Ballet Preljocaj when it moved into its current home of residence at Pavillon Noir of Aix-en-Provence.

Main choreographies
 1984 : Aventures coloniales
 1984 : Marché noir
 1985 : Larmes blanches
 1985 : Peurs bleues
 1986 : À nos héros
 1987 : Le Petit Napperon bouge
 1987 : Hallali Romée
 1988 : Liqueurs de chair
 1988 : Les raboteurs after painting by Caillebotte
 1989 : Noces (répertoire)
 1989 : Un trait d'union
 1990 : Amer America
 1990 : Romeo and Juliet
 1992 : La Peau du Monde
 1993 : Parade (répertoire)
 1993 : Noces (new version)
 1993 : Le Spectre de la Rose (répertoire)
 1994 : Le Parc (répertoire) for the Ballet de l'Opéra national de Paris
 1995 : Annonciation (Bessie Award in 1997)
 1995 : Petit Essai sur le temps qui passe
 1995 : L'Anoure (répertoire)
 1996 : The Firebird (répertoire)
 1996 : Romeo and Juliet (new version) in collaboration with Enki Bilal
 1996 : L'Annonciation (répertoire)
 1997 : La Stravaganza
 1997 : Paysages après la bataille
 1998 : Centaures
 1998 : Casanova (répertoire)
 1999 : Personne n'épouse les méduses
 2000 : Portraits in Corpore
 2000 : MC/14-22 (Ceci est mon corps)
 2001 : The Rite of Spring
 2001 :  Helikopter on a composition by Karlheinz Stockhausen
 2002 : Near Life Experience
 2003 : L'Annonciation (video version)
 2004 : MC/14-22 (new version, répertoire)
 2004 : Le Songe de Médée (répertoire)
 2004 : Empty Moves (part I) on a music by John Cage
 2004 : N (répertoire) with Kurt Hentschläger (Image, light & stage design) and Ulf Langheinrich (music and sound design)
 2005 : Les 4 saisons... in collaboration with Fabrice Hyber (répertoire)
 2007 : Empty Moves (Part I and II) (répertoire)
 2007 : Eldorado (Sonntags Abschied) (répertoire) with a dedicated composition for the ballet by Karlheinz Stockhausen
 2008 : Blanche Neige (Snow White)
 2009 : Le funambule
 2010 : Siddharta
 2010 : And then A Thousand Years Of Peace
 2011 : suivront mille ans de calme
 2012 : What I Call Oblivion
 2013 : The Nights 2015 : Return to Berratham 2016 : The Painting on The Wall 2017 : Still Life 2018 : Gravity 2019 : Winterreise 2020 : Swan Lake 2021 : Deleuze / Hendrix 2022 : MythologiesFilmography
 2016 : Polina''

References

External links

 Official site of Ballet Preljocaj

1957 births
Living people
People from Sucy-en-Brie
People from Aix-en-Provence
French male dancers
French choreographers
French film directors
French people of Albanian descent
Prix Benois de la Danse winners
Bessie Award winners
Albanian Roman Catholics
Contemporary dancers